May 21 - Eastern Orthodox Church calendar - May 23

All fixed commemorations below celebrated on June 4 by Orthodox Churches on the Old Calendar.

For May 22nd, Orthodox Churches on the Old Calendar commemorate the Saints listed on May 9.

Feasts

 Commemoration of the Holy Fathers of the Second Ecumenical Council (381)

Saints

 Righteous Melchizedek, King of Salem (ancient Jerusalem) (c. 2000 BC)
 Martyr Sophia the Healer.
 Martyr Marcellus, by being placed in molten lead.
 Martyr Codratus (Quadratus), by being dragged by horses.
 Martyr Basiliscus of Kamani (c. 285-305)
 Saint Donatus of Thmuis, Bishop and Martyr (316)
 Saint John Vladimir, King of Serbia, Martyr, Wonderworker (1015)

Pre-Schism Western saints

 Saint Ausonius, first Bishop of Angoulême (1st or 3rd century)
 Saint Marcian of Ravenna, Bishop and Confessor (c. 127)
 Martyrs Castus and Emilius, by fire, in Carthage (250)
 Martyrs Timothy, Faustinus and Venustus, in Rome, under Julian the Apostate (362)
 Saint Helen of Carnarvon (Elen Luyddog, Helen of Caernarfon), Princess, a late 4th-century founder of churches in Wales, and wife of Emperor Magnus Clemens Maximus (383-388)
 Saint Helen of Auxerre (c. 418)
 Saint Julia of Corsica the martyr, who was crucified (5th century)
 Saint Quiteria the virgin-martyr, in Spain (5th century)
 Saint Romanus of Subiaco (Romanus of Auxerre), ascetic who ministered to Saint Benedict of Nursia (560)
 Saint Fulk (c. 600)
 Saint Boethian of Pierrepont (near Laon), Irish, Benedictine monk, martyred in France (7th century)
 Saint Conall (Conald, Coel), of Inniskeel (Inniscoel, Innis-coel), County Donegal, Abbot of the island monastery of Inniskeel, where there is a holy well dedicated to him (7th century)
 Saint John of Parma, abbot of Saint John's at Parma from 973 to c. 982, then under Cluniac observance (c. 982)
 Saint Bobo (Beuvon), hermit (c. 985)

Post-Schism Orthodox saints

 Saint Kali of Asia Minor (c. 14th century)
 New Hieromartyr Zachariah of Prussa (1802)
 Blessed James, youth, of Borovichi (Novgorod), Wonderworker (1540)
 New Martyr Demetrios of Peloponnesos (1803)
 Venerable Monk-martyr Paul of Mt. Athos, at Tripolis, Peloponnesus (1818)

New martyrs and confessors

 New Hieromartyr Michael Borisov, priest (1942)

Other commemorations

 Synaxis of the Cyprus Icon ("Sophianois" Icon) of the Most Holy Mother of God.
 Repose of Cleopas of Valaam, disciple of Saint Paisius Velichkovsky (1816)
 Repose of Eldress Macrina of Volos (1995)

Icon gallery

Notes

References

Sources 
 May 22/June 4. Orthodox Calendar (PRAVOSLAVIE.RU).
 June 4 / May 22. HOLY TRINITY RUSSIAN ORTHODOX CHURCH(A parish of the Patriarchate of Moscow).
 Complete List of Saints. Protection of the Mother of God Church (POMOG).
 Russian Orthodox Christian Menaion Calendar - May. St. Nicholas Russian Orthodox Church, McKinney (Dallas area) Texas.
 May 22. Latin Saints of the Orthodox Patriarchate of Rome.
 May 22. The Roman Martyrology.
Greek Sources
 Great Synaxaristes:  22 ΜΑΪΟΥ. ΜΕΓΑΣ ΣΥΝΑΞΑΡΙΣΤΗΣ.
  Συναξαριστής. 22 Μαΐου. ECCLESIA.GR. (H ΕΚΚΛΗΣΙΑ ΤΗΣ ΕΛΛΑΔΟΣ). 
Russian Sources
  4 июня (22 мая). Православная Энциклопедия под редакцией Патриарха Московского и всея Руси Кирилла (электронная версия). (Orthodox Encyclopedia - Pravenc.ru).
  22 мая (ст.ст.) 4 июня 2013 (нов. ст.). Русская Православная Церковь Отдел внешних церковных связей. (DECR).

May in the Eastern Orthodox calendar